Leucanopsis racema is a moth of the family Erebidae. It was described by William Schaus in 1905. It is found in French Guiana and Peru.

References

 

racema
Moths described in 1905